Bazokol (also Romanized as Bāzokol; also known as Bāzūkol) is a village in Reza Mahalleh Rural District, in the Central District of Rudsar County, Gilan Province, Iran. At the 2006 census, its population was 244, in 85 families.

References 

Populated places in Rudsar County